The Urik is a river in Irkutsk Oblast, Russia. It is a right tributary of the Belaya.

References

External links 
 Pictures of Urik River

Rivers of Irkutsk Oblast